Heliothis acesias is a species of moth of the family Noctuidae. It is found from north-eastern Nevada and southern Idaho, northward to southern Alberta, then eastward to southern and eastern Ontario.

Adults are on from June to September.

External links

A Review Of The Phloxiphaga Group Of Thegenus Heliothis (Noctuidae: Heliothentinae*)With Description Of A New Species

Heliothis
Moths of North America
Moths described in 1872